La villanella rapita (The Abducted Country Girl) is an opera giocosa in two acts by Francesco Bianchi. The libretto was by Giovanni Bertati.

Performance history
The opera was first performed at the Teatro San Moisè in Venice in the autumn of 1783. It was then given at the Eszterháza Theater in Süttör on 29 August 1784. It was also produced at the Little Theatre in the Haymarket in London under  on 27 February 1790.

A pasticcio with the same title, with some music by Bianchi as well as Paisiello, Guglielmi, Giacomo Gotifredo Ferrari, Sarti and Soler was performed at Théâtre Feydeau in Paris on 5 June 1789.

Mozart additions
Mozart contributed a vocal quartet, "Dite almeno in che mancai?", K. 479, and a vocal terzet, "Mandina amabile", K. 480, for a performance at the Burgtheater in Vienna on  1785. (The former work was first heard in public on 5 November, and the latter on 28 November.) The singers involved were Vincenzo Calvesi (Count), Celeste Coltellini (Mandina), Stefano Mandini (Pippo), and Francesco Bussani (Biaggio), the last named in K. 479 only.

Roles

Synopsis
The count takes a liking to a young bride, Mandina, at her pre-wedding banquet, lures her away from her bridegroom, Pippo, and then abducts her in a drugged state back to his palace. Mandina, after a little experience of upper-class luxuries, eventually establishes her innocence and marries Pippo after all.

References

Operas by Francesco Bianchi
1783 operas
Italian-language operas
Operas